The Somliland Quality Control Commission (SQCC) is a Somaliland government agency, responsible for the standardization, Measurement and conformity assessment services in Somaliland.
The head of the commission is the chairman, and is nominated by the President, and then approved by the Parliament, the current chairman is Abdiwasac mahamed Yusuf.

See also
 Politics of Somaliland
 Good Governance and Anti-Corruption Commission
 Somaliland Civil Service Commission
 Somaliland Civil Aviation and Airports Authority

References

Government agencies of Somaliland
Government agencies established in 2010
2010 establishments in Somaliland